Lindsay Williams (12 July 1933 – 18 April 2008) was a New Zealand cricketer. He played in six first-class matches for Wellington from 1951 to 1954.

See also
 List of Wellington representative cricketers

References

External links
 

1933 births
2008 deaths
New Zealand cricketers
Wellington cricketers
Cricketers from Auckland